is a 1963 drama film directed by Hiromichi Horikawa.

Release and reception
Pressure of Guilt was released theatrically in Japan by Toho on April 10, 1963. The film was released in the United States by Toho International with English subtitles in January 1964.

In Japan, Keiju Kobayashi won the award for Best Actor at the Mainichi Film Concours for his work in this film and The Elegant Life of Mr. Everyman. In a contemporary review, Tube. of Variety commented on the film, stating that "the story seems somewhat hokey and overly involved, it has been portrayed with force and conviction by a talented cast and directed with considerable cinematic flair".

References

Footnotes

Sources

External links
 

Japanese drama films
1960s Japanese-language films
Toho films
1963 drama films
1960s Japanese films